Diddy Kong Racing is a 1997 racing video game developed and published by Rare for the Nintendo 64. The game is set on Timber's Island and revolves around Diddy Kong and his friends' attempt to defeat the intergalactic antagonist, a wizarding pig named Wizpig, through winning a series of races. The player can take control of any of the featured characters throughout the game. Diddy Kong Racing features five worlds with four racetracks each, and the ability to drive a car, hovercraft, or pilot an aeroplane.

Development began after the release of Killer Instinct 2, and was intended to be a real-time strategy game known as Wild Cartoon Kingdom in its early stages. As time progressed, the focus of development shifted from a Walt Disney World-influenced racing game to a unique title named Pro-Am 64, in which Nintendo had no involvement. Due to the delays of Banjo-Kazooie, Rare felt that they needed a stronger intellectual property to attract a wider audience for a game scheduled to release before Christmas 1997, thus making the decision to base a game on the character of Diddy Kong.

Diddy Kong Racing received critical acclaim upon release. The graphics, audio and gameplay were the most praised aspects of the game, with minor criticism directed at the game's repetition. The game has sold 4.8 million copies since release and stands as the Nintendo 64's eighth best-selling game. A sequel named Donkey Kong Racing was in development for the GameCube, but was abandoned in August 2002, one month before Microsoft purchased Rare for £375 million. An enhanced remake for the Nintendo DS titled Diddy Kong Racing DS was released worldwide in early 2007.

Gameplay

In Diddy Kong Racing, players can choose one of ten characters, who have access to three different vehicles: car, hovercraft and aeroplane. The car is an all-round vehicle, but it is the slowest on surfaces such as sand and water. The hovercraft is designed for both sand and water areas, but lacks in acceleration and manoeuvrability. The aeroplane is designed to access aerial areas; it is good at acceleration and manoeuvring, but it has the slowest speed. Each racetrack has a set of boosters known as "zippers" that temporarily boost the player's speed, as well as featuring regenerating balloons of various colours that provide power-ups. There are five different types of balloons: red, blue, green, yellow, and rainbow. Red balloons grant missiles to attack racers ahead, blue balloons grant a speed boost, yellow balloons grant shields to protect the player from attacks, green balloons grant deployable traps to delay other racers, and rainbow balloons grant a magnet ability that brings the player closer to the nearest racer. If multiple balloons of the same colour are picked up, the power-up will be upgraded to a more powerful version. A total of two upgrades are available for each balloon. Additionally, racetracks contain non-regenerating bananas that add to speed when they are picked up. A maximum of ten bananas will improve the speed, but can also be obtained to prevent other players from gaining speed. If a racer gets hit, two bananas will be deducted.

In "Adventure Mode", players control the racer of their choice to progress through the story. Players begin on Timber's Island, which consists of five interconnected worlds; Dino Domain, Snowflake Mountain, Sherbet Island, Dragon Forest, and Future Fun Land. The worlds are opened up by collecting balloons, except for Future Fun Land, which is a hidden world reached by accomplishing several secret objectives. Each world contains four racetracks, an unlockable battle stage and a race against a boss character. If the player defeats Wizpig in Future Fun Land, obtains all amulet pieces and collect all the gold medals, the player will be able to play in a mode called "Adventure 2". In this mode, all the balloons change colour to platinum and the tracks are inverted from left to right. The game also features four battle modes which consist of two deathmatch maps, a capture-the-flag-style battle and a mode which involves opponents capturing eggs. The battle modes are not initially selectable, and must be unlocked by collecting keys hidden in each of the worlds.

Plot
Timber the Tiger's parents go on holiday and leave their son in charge of the island they live on, prompting him and his friends to organise a race. Their enjoyment is interrupted when a sinister intergalactic pig-wizard named Wizpig arrives at Timber's Island and attempts to take it over after having conquered his own planet. He turns the island's four guardians (Tricky the Triceratops, Bluey the Walrus, Bubbler the Octopus and Smokey the Dragon) into his henchmen. The only solution available to the island's inhabitants is to defeat Wizpig in an elaborate series of races that involve cars, hovercraft, and aeroplanes. Drumstick the Rooster, the best racer on the island, fails this challenge and is transformed into a frog by Wizpig's magic.

Timber hires a team of eight racers: Diddy Kong, the first recruit; Conker the Squirrel and Banjo the Bear, recruited by Diddy; Krunch the Kremling, Diddy's enemy who follows after him; Tiptup the Turtle, T.T. the Stopwatch, Pipsy the Mouse, and Bumper the Badger, all inhabitants of Timber's island. Aided by Taj, an Indian elephant-like genie residing on the island, they eventually complete all of Wizpig's challenges and confront Wizpig himself to a race and defeat him. Shortly afterward, Drumstick is turned back into a rooster, and Wizpig leaves for his home planet, Future Fun Land. Fearing that Wizpig would again attempt to invade Timber's Island, the islanders travel to Future Fun Land for a second challenge. When Wizpig loses the second race, the rocket he rides on malfunctions and launches him to the moon. However, an additional cutscene reveals Wizpig's spaceship flying through the sky, unscathed.

Development

Development of the game began after the release of Killer Instinct 2, in which a team was split into making Killer Instinct Gold for the Nintendo 64 and a new racing game for that console. At its first stage of development, Diddy Kong Racing was conceived as a real-time strategy game with a caveman/time-travel theme worked on by a team of four Rare members; Chris Stamper, Lee Musgrave, Rob Harrison and Lee Schuneman. During later stages of development, the game became influenced by Walt Disney World and soon evolved into an adventure game called Wild Cartoon Kingdom, with which Nintendo had no involvement. In June 1997, the game was altered to Pro-Am 64, an unrelated follow-up to the NES racing game R.C. Pro-Am. According to Schuneman, the Pro Am 64 project featured three-wheeled trikes in contrast to radio-controlled cars.

With Banjo-Kazooie being delayed until the summer of 1998, the team was adamant for a release of an AAA video game in time for 1997's Christmas season. Rare felt that Pro Am 64 did not have a strong enough intellectual property to capture the attention of consumers, and thus changed the licence to feature Diddy Kong. According to Musgrave, the decision to choose Diddy Kong rather than Donkey Kong was based on their own choice, a decision which Nintendo "enjoyed". Once the intellectual property was changed, the team were left to adapt the visual aesthetics of the game and packaging before it could be released. Musgrave recalled that the ultimate goal of the game was to make it "run as fast" as Mario Kart 64, which proved difficult during development as the latter game utilised 2D character sprites whereas Diddy Kong Racing used fully 3D models. Musgrave later attributed the success of the overall project due to the "small team" of 14 people who worked on it. In an October 2012 interview, Musgrave said that Timber the Tiger would have been the main character of Pro Am 64 had the intellectual property for Diddy Kong Racing not been conceived. Two of the characters who featured in Diddy Kong Racing, Banjo the Bear and Conker the Squirrel, starred in games (Banjo-Kazooie and Conker's Bad Fur Day, respectively) which were unveiled to the public before Diddy Kong Racing, at the June 1997 Electronic Entertainment Expo (E3), but ultimately not released until after Diddy Kong Racing. Rare stated that they chose not to exhibit Diddy Kong Racing at E3 because of the proprietary animation technology used in the game.

Soundtrack
The music for the game was composed by David Wise. The soundtrack was first released in Japan on 1 April 1998, with 42 tracks, while a version of the album was released in Europe with the same number of tracks. For its United States release only 16 tracks were featured. The disc itself was specially shaped in the form of Diddy Kong's head, which was unplayable in certain CD players.

Release
Due to most of the Nintendo 64's planned 1997 Christmas season line-up being delayed until 1998, Diddy Kong Racing became the main Nintendo 64 release for the holiday shopping season, and a majority of Nintendo's $200 million advertising budget for the entire year was allocated to promoting the game. The game had a $20 million marketing budget in North America. Diddy Kong Racing also held the distinction of being the only game in the North American Christmas season line-up for which development was contracted by Nintendo; the other two first-party Nintendo 64 games in the line-up, Bomberman 64 and Mischief Makers, were both licensed from Japanese third-party publishers.

Reception

The game received critical acclaim upon release. The Nintendo 64 version holds an aggregate score of 89% at GameRankings based on 20 reviews and 88 at Metacritic based on 15 reviews, whereas the Nintendo DS remake received a score of 67% at GameRankings based on 42 reviews and a score of 63 at Metacritic, based on 39 reviews. Diddy Kong Racing sold approximately 4.5 million copies worldwide; which included 3.78 million copies sold in the United States and PAL regions, and 653,928 copies in Japan. At the 1999 Milia festival in Cannes, it took home a "Gold" prize for revenues above €15 million in the European Union during the previous year. It stands as the Nintendo 64's eighth best-selling game, and broke one million units sold in the United States within three weeks of its release.

The graphics and gameplay were the most praised aspects of the game. Some critics noted how it minimised pop-up without resorting to the use of distance fog. Jeff Gerstmann of GameSpot disputed this, saying that the game has both pop-up and distance fog in amounts comparable to the average Nintendo 64 game. He nonetheless stated that the game was a "pleasure to look at" and praised the detail of the tracks. Doug Perry of IGN heralded the visuals as the most "spectacular of its kind", and praised Rare's ability to master dynamic animation through enabling polygons to span larger surfaces without loss of framerate. Furthermore, Perry stated that the game's technical achievements were enough to leave "even the most critical Japanese gamer [to] look upon with smiling eyes".

Although Crispin Boyer opened his review of the game for Electronic Gaming Monthly (EGM) with the warning "Don't dismiss this out-of-the-blue racer as a Mario Kart 64 clone", most reviews compared the two games. Gerstmann suspected Nintendo of rushing Diddy Kong Racing to market in order to fill a quarter left vacant by delays of other Nintendo games, and argued it was much too soon after Mario Kart 64s debut to release such a similar game. Other critics, including Boyer's EGM co-reviewers, focused on Diddy Kong Racings perceived superiority to Mario Kart 64. Dan Hsu of EGM said it "beats Mario Kart 64 in every department", particularly mentioning the superior balance and level designs. Edge praised the adventure and progression aspect of the game, stating that the game's single-player mode is "everything Mario Kart 64 should have been."

The character designs met with a variety of opinions. EGMs Shawn Smith praised the characters as "hilarious". Next Generation, by contrast, said the character designs are "pathetic and obvious, molded from the same cookie cutter as Banjo-Kazooie and Conker", noting the formulaic use of anthropomorphic animal characters and the simplistic application of each animal's characteristics to gameplay. Perry felt that the vocals of characters in the game were "heartwarming" and "comical", while also stating that "some of the characters are just too damn cute and are certain to annoy older gamers."

Overall assessments of the game were mostly positive. GamePro gave it a 4.5 out of 5 for sound and a perfect 5.0 in control, graphics, and fun factor, calling it "a feverishly fun Nintendo 64 racer that combines elements of Mario Kart 64, Wave Race 64, and Pilotwings 64 into one spectacular game." EGM named it "Game of the Month", with its four reviewers lauding the challenging gameplay and numerous objectives to tackle. Gerstmann instead counted the latter as the game's greatest weakness, arguing that having to repeatedly play through the same courses with slightly different objectives makes the game excessively repetitive. He concluded that the game is far better than Mario Kart 64, but the repetitiveness "ultimately kills it." Next Generation fell more in line with the majority, remarking that the combination of racing and adventure elements works well, and that "Diddy Kong Racing shows Rare's pure craftmanship, displaying keen subtleties that eventually win players over."

In a retrospective review, Andrew Donaldson of Nintendo Life stated that the game was visually "incredibly vibrant" and "captivating" for a game of the early Nintendo 64 era. Scott McCall of AllGame acknowledged its only shortcoming was its "excessive" amount of clipping, although he admitted it was not "unbearable". He praised the wide range of audio in the game, including its voice acting and soundtrack; he heralded the music as "interesting" and "fitting" to its race tracks, also considering it superior to that of Mario Kart 64. Donaldson criticised game's presentation as too "cutesy", especially in terms of the characters' voices. However, he praised the "upbeat" and "catchy" soundtrack, saying that each track had its own unique tune to suit the distinct environment. In 2009, Official Nintendo Magazine ranked the game 79th on a list of the greatest Nintendo games of all time.

EGM named Diddy Kong Racing "Racing Game of the Year" at its 1997 Editors' Choice Awards. Diddy Kong Racing won the Console Racing Game of the Year at the Academy of Interactive Arts & Sciences in 1998, beating Mario Kart 64, Moto Racer and NASCAR 98.

Legacy

Sequels
After the release of Diddy Kong Racing, Rare began development on a sequel named Donkey Kong Racing for the GameCube, which featured Donkey Kong as the titular character. A pre-rendered CG video of the game was shown at E3 2001, which displayed a parody of the speederbike scene from Return of the Jedi. According to Lee Musgrave, the game featured a unique mechanic which involved riding on animals rather than driving vehicles. The player could switch between different types of animals mid-race; larger animals could destroy obstacles, whereas smaller ones allowed more manoeuvrability. Development of Donkey Kong Racing was cancelled when Nintendo turned down the opportunity to purchase its remaining 51 per cent stake in Rare, and the developer was bought out by Microsoft for £375 million in 2002.

After the buyout, Rare took what had been done with Donkey Kong Racing and created a prototype for the Xbox which expanded into an adventure game similar to the original setup of Diddy Kong Racing. Musgrave stated that the concept was essentially "built from scratch" and featured a limited multiplayer version at one point. The concept was in development over 18 months and evolved from being an animal-orientated racing game to an open-world game with Tamagotchi-style features, in which nurturing animals was a "key mechanic". By this point, Donkey Kong Racing had evolved into Sabreman Stampede, part of Rare's Sabreman series. Sabreman Stampede was set for release on the Xbox 360, but was cancelled due to a lack of focus and Rare's unfamiliarity with the hardware.

Aside from Donkey Kong Racing, two other sequels to Diddy Kong Racing were in development. One, named Diddy Kong Pilot, with planes as the only vehicle, was planned for a release on the Game Boy Advance. Originally announced alongside Donkey Kong Racing at E3 2001, the game became Banjo-Pilot after Nintendo sold their share of Rare to Microsoft. At the time of its announcement, the game featured the ability to play using a tilt function as well as a D-pad, and contained at least five tracks. The other, titled Diddy Kong Racing Adventure, was a rejected pitch made by Climax Studios for the Nintendo GameCube around 2004. The project was never announced to the public in any capacity, and only became known after a video game archivist acquired the prototype and published a video about it in November 2016.

As Timber was bypassed as the main character in Diddy Kong Racing, Rare's next game was planned to keep Timber as the main character, according to Kev Bayliss. This game was originally planned as Dinosaur Planet for the Nintendo 64, with Timber as a time traveller to a prehistoric period and gameplay similar to The Legend of Zelda: Ocarina of Time, but over time, they found it better to replace Timber with wholly new characters. This game became Star Fox Adventures for the GameCube at the suggestion of Nintendo.

Remake
Diddy Kong Racing DS is a Nintendo DS remake of Diddy Kong Racing. Developed by Rare and published by Nintendo, it was released in February 2007 in North America, and April in Europe and Australia. This version received enhanced visuals and framerate in addition to touchscreen functions and Rumble Pak support for force feedback. Four new Donkey Kong themed racetracks were included in the remake, along with several modifications to the soundtrack. Banjo and Conker were replaced by Tiny Kong and Dixie Kong, while new playable characters Taj and Wizpig were also added. The DS version also features new modes which allow the player to create their own racetracks, customise their characters through recording voices, and an online multiplayer function. The racetrack creation mode replaced the original game's "battle modes". The game was met with mixed reviews upon release, with critics asserting that the new additions were "gimmicky" and the touchscreen controls felt "horribly sensitive".

References

Further reading

External links
 
 Official Diddy Kong Racing site 
 Diddy Kong Racing at MobyGames

1997 video games
Christmas video games
Dinosaurs in video games
Donkey Kong video games
Kart racing video games
Interactive Achievement Award winners
Multiplayer and single-player video games
Nintendo 64 games
Racing video games
Rare (company) games
Vehicular combat games
Video games scored by David Wise
Video games set in amusement parks 
Video games set on fictional islands
Video games with alternate endings
D.I.C.E. Award for Racing Game of the Year winners
Video games developed in the United Kingdom